S. Robert Morgan is an American television actor and theatre director. He starred in the HBO drama series The Wire as Butchie from the second season until the show's fifth and final season.

Personal life
Morgan is from Fort Washington, Maryland and is a regular patron of the Martin Luther King Jr. Memorial Library, which The Washington Post has described as "A Haven for Sightless Readers". He lost his sight in his twenties due to macular degeneration.

Filmography
Literary Visions (1992) (Actor) (2 episodes)
The Wire (2003–08) (Butchie) (10 episodes)
Blind Date (2009) (Fred)
Luke Cage (2016) (Oliver) (Moment of Truth)

References

External links
 

Year of birth missing (living people)
Living people
African-American male actors
Place of birth missing (living people)
American male television actors
American blind people
Male actors from Washington, D.C.
Blind actors
21st-century African-American people